The Electoral district of Lyndhurst was an electorate of the Victorian Legislative Assembly. It was located in the south eastern suburbs of Melbourne. Included within its boundaries were Bangholme and Lyndhurst and parts of other surrounding suburbs, such as Noble Park and Springvale.

The seat was created at the 2002 election, replacing the district of Springvale. At that election it recorded the second biggest swing to Labor in the state, extending Labor's margin in the electorate to around 25%.

On 15 February 2013 the sitting member Tim Holding resigned, the resulting Lyndhurst by-election on 27 April saw Martin Pakula retain the seat for Labor. The seat was abolished prior to the 2014 election and largely replaced by Keysborough.

Members for Lyndhurst

Election results

See also
 Parliaments of the Australian states and territories
 Members of the Victorian Legislative Assembly

External links
 Electorate profile: Lyndhurst, Victorian Electoral Commission

2002 establishments in Australia
2014 disestablishments in Australia
Former electoral districts of Victoria (Australia)